Enorma timonensis is a Gram-positive, rod-shaped, non-endospore-forming and non-motile bacterium from the genus of Enorma which has been isolated from human feces.

References 

Actinomycetota
Coriobacteriaceae
Bacteria described in 2016